Odontoceridae is a family of mortarjoint casemakers in the order Trichoptera. There are about 12 genera and at least 100 described species in Odontoceridae.

The type genus for Odontoceridae is Odontocerum W.E. Leach, 1815.

Genera
 Barynema Banks, 1939
 Barypenthus Burmeister, 1839
 Inthanopsyche Malicky, 1989
 Lannapsyche Malicky, 1989
 Marilia Mueller, 1880
 Namamyia Banks, 1905
 Nerophilus Banks, 1899
 Odontocerum Leach in Brewster, 1815
 Parthina Denning, 1954
 Perissoneura McLachlan, 1871
 Pseudogoera Carpenter, 1933
 Psilotreta Banks, 1899

References

Further reading

 
 
 
 
 
 
 
 

Trichoptera families
Integripalpia